is a Japanese cross-country skier. She competed at the 1998 Winter Olympics and the 2002 Winter Olympics.

References

External links
 

1974 births
Living people
Japanese female cross-country skiers
Olympic cross-country skiers of Japan
Cross-country skiers at the 1998 Winter Olympics
Cross-country skiers at the 2002 Winter Olympics
Sportspeople from Akita Prefecture
Cross-country skiers at the 1999 Asian Winter Games